There is also the Town of Mount Pleasant in Green County.

Mount Pleasant is a village in Racine County, Wisconsin, United States. As of the 2020 census, the village's population was 27,732.

History 

The community was established as the Town of Mount Pleasant in 1842 when a small group of residents met to organize the settlement. In 1972, Mount Pleasant adopted its zoning ordinance, which established significant locally controlled development. On September 16, 2003 Mount Pleasant incorporated as a village following a referendum passed by the residents.

Geography 
Local Area Code is 262.

Demographics

2010 census 
As of the census of 2010, there were 26,197 people, 11,136 households, and 7,395 families living in the village. The racial makeup of the village was 86.0% White, 6.7% African American, 0.2% Native American, 2.1% Asian, 2.9% from other races, and 2.0% from two or more races. Hispanic or Latino of any race were 8.3% of the population.

There were 11,136 households, of which 26.4% had children under the age of 18 living with them, 54.1% were married couples living together, 8.5% had a female householder with no husband present, 3.9% had a male householder with no wife present, and 33.6% were non-families. 29.2% of all households were made up of individuals, and 14.3% had someone living alone who was 65 years of age or older. The average household size was 2.33 and the average family size was 2.86.

The median age in the village was 45.8 years. 20.5% of residents were under the age of 18; 6.5% were between the ages of 18 and 24; 22% were from 25 to 44; 31.3% were from 45 to 64; and 19.8% were 65 years of age or older. The gender makeup of the village was 47.9% male and 52.1% female.

2000 census 
As of the census of 2000, there were 23,142 people, 9,453 households, and 6,513 families living in the village. The population density was 662.6 people per square mile (255.8/km2). There were 9,768 housing units at an average density of 279.7 per square mile (108.0/km2). The racial makeup of the village was 89.17% White, 6.39% African American, 0.26% Native American, 1.21% Asian, 0.03% Pacific Islander, 1.83% from other races, and 1.11% from two or more races. Hispanic or Latino of any race were 4.96% of the population.

There were 9,453 households, out of which 27.8% had children under the age of 18 living with them, 58.3% were married couples living together, 7.7% had a female householder with no husband present, and 31.1% were non-families. 27.2% of all households were made up of individuals, and 12.8% had someone living alone who was 65 years of age or older. The average household size was 2.40 and the average family size was 2.93.

In the village, the population was spread out, with 22.3% under the age of 18, 7.0% from 18 to 24, 24.6% from 25 to 44, 27.3% from 45 to 64, and 18.7% who were 65 years of age or older. The median age was 43 years. For every 100 females, there were 92.3 males. For every 100 females age 18 and over, there were 88.8 males.

The median income for a household in the village was $52,869, and the median income for a family was $63,937. Males had a median income of $47,871 versus $31,317 for females. The per capita income for the village was $27,123. About 2.9% of families and 4.3% of the population were below the poverty line, including 5.4% of those under age 18 and 5.7% of those age 65 or over.

Economy

In October 2017, Foxconn announced that it would build a $10 billion flat-panel TV campus in Mount Pleasant. Mount Pleasant offered $860 million in tax incentives to attract Foxconn, borrowing funds to do so. Mount Pleasant also declared some residential areas as 'blighted' to require residents to vacate the project area. Larger landowners were privately offered up to 5x their assessed value, while smaller landowners were later offered 1.4x assessed value at time of assessment, which in some cases ended up being less than actual value. A number of landowners sued to stop the village's use of eminent domain laws to benefit a private company. Construction was targeted to begin in the second quarter of 2018.  The plan for the campus is to expand in phases over five or more years.

In March 2019, with construction still not started, Foxconn announced that they intend to have a functional plant by the end of 2020, though the plant would be smaller than originally planned.

In November 2020, construction lagged. According to the company, this was due to problems related to the COVID-19 pandemic.  Even with only partial construction, estimates were that Foxconn would be the biggest tax payer in the county.   The company has still not made clear exactly what will be produced on the 1,000-acre campus. 

Numerous critics have cited the case of Foxconn in Wisconsin as an example of some of the most egregious corporate welfare and as an abuse of eminent domain. As reported in National Review, "...[the worst] is when governments accompany subsidies with the eminent-domain seizure of citizens’ property...[as with the case of Foxconn in Wisconsin]..."

Government

The Village of Mount Pleasant is governed by a six-member board and a village president. The president and the board are elected by general election for a term of two years per member. The board enacts local ordinances and approves the village budget. Mount Pleasant has an elected village-wide municipal judge.

Village services include a full-time police department, full-time consolidated fire department (South Shore Fire Department), highway/public works department, and in-house building, planning, development, engineering, and finance departments. The village operates and maintains its own sanitary sewer and storm water utilities, with municipal drinking water provided by the city of Racine.

Mount Pleasant is represented by Bryan Steil (R) in the United States House of Representatives, and by Ron Johnson (R) and Tammy Baldwin (D) in the United States Senate. Robert Wirch (D) and Van Wanggaard (R) represent Mount Pleasant in the Wisconsin State Senate, and Robin Vos (R), Tom Weatherston (R), and Peter Barca (D) represent Mount Pleasant in the Wisconsin State Assembly.

Fire Protection/Ambulance Service from the South Shore Fire Department
Police Service from the Mount Pleasant Police Department and Racine County Sheriff

Education 

Mount Pleasant's public schools are managed by the Racine Unified School District. Several elementary schools serve sections of the town, including Dr. Jones, West Ridge, Schulte, and Gifford K–8 School. Two K–8 schools, Mitchell and Gifford, serve sections for middle school. Case High School is in Mount Pleasant and serves almost all of the area, while some parts are zoned to Park High School in Racine.

The University of Wisconsin–Parkside is located two miles south of Mount Pleasant in Kenosha. Gateway Technical College is nearby.

Notable people

 Alyssa Marie Bohm, chosen as the 2019 Miss Wisconsin
 Henry Herzog, Wisconsin State Representative, businessman, and farmer, owned a farm in the Town of Mount Pleasant
 August Piper, Wisconsin State Representative and farmer was born in the Town of Mount Pleasant; Piper served as chairman of the Mount Pleasant Town Board
 Fred Venturelli, NFL player, was buried in Mount Pleasant

References

External links 
Village of Mount Pleasant
Racine County Convention & Visitors Bureau

Villages in Racine County, Wisconsin
Villages in Wisconsin